Hélder Lima de Queiroz (born 1963) is a Brazilian conservation biologist, primatologist, and fish behaviorist.

He is the Director of the Instituto de Desenvolvimento Sustentável Mamirauá (MISD) in Amazonas state, dedicated to protecting the biodiversity of the Amazon flood forest and the well-being of those who live there, through community management of the environment.

Queiroz received his doctorate in 2000 from St. Andrews University, Scotland, in Environmental And Evolutionary Biology, with the thesis "Natural history and conservation of pirarucu, Arapaima gigas, at the Amazonian várzea: Red giants in muddy waters". His advisor was the population biologist Anne E. Magurran.

He has discovered and named a new species of capuchin monkey (Queiroz, 1992). He currently (2013) works on Amazon flooded forest ecology, ecology and behaviour of Amazonian vertebrates, and Indigenous hunting. He is a graduate faculty member in zoology at the Museu Paraense Emílio Goeldi, and animal sciences at Federal University of Pará State (UFPA), in Belém.

Selected publications
SOUSA, L. L.; QUEIROZ, H. L.; AYRES, J. M. 2006. The mottled-face tamarin, Sguinus inustus, in the Amanã Sustainable Development Reserve. Neotropical Primates, Vol. 12, 121-122.
QUEIROZ, H. L. 1992. A new species of capuchin monkey, genus Cebus Erxleben, 1777 (Cebidae: Primates) from Eastern Brazilian Amazonia. Goeldiana, Zoologia Vol. 15, 1-13.
QUEIROZ, H. L. 1994. Preguiças e Guaribas: Os Mamíferos Folívoros Arborícolas do Mamirauá. Brasília: Sociedade Civil Mamirauá & CNPq. 120 pp.
QUEIROZ, H. L.; MAGURRAN, A. E. 2005. Safety in Numbers? Schoaling behaviour of the Amazonian red-bellied piranha. Biological Letters of the Royal Society, Vol. 1, n. 2, 155-157.

References

External links
 St-Andrews.ac.uk - 'Dr. Helder Queiroz', University of St. Andrews ; Dr. Helder Lima de Queiroz - CVLattes - CNPq  
 Mamirauá Institute for Sustainable Development

Brazilian zoologists
Primatologists
Brazilian biologists
Brazilian scientists
Living people
1963 births
Alumni of the University of St Andrews